"Solo Por Ti" is a song written by Marco Flores for Paulina Rubio's fourth album Planeta Paulina released in 1996. It was produced by Marco Flores and released as the album's single in Mexico. The song peaked at #6 in the El Siglo de Torreón's Ballads Charts, the chart covers radios from Mexico City only.

An English language version was released in late 1996, entitled "Only For You", and was released for the English dance market.

Music video
A music video for "Solo Por Ti" was directed by Fernando de Garay and filmed in a desert in Mexico. The filming took place at the same time the singer shot the TV special for the album Planeta Paulina, in the summer of 1996.

Formats and track listings

Mexico CD single:
Version Album  4:14
Mix  7:47
70's Edit  4:02
Dance Extended Mix  6:39
Mix Edit 3:55
Only For You (English Version)  4:14

References

Paulina Rubio songs
1996 singles
EMI Latin singles
1995 songs
Songs written by Paulina Rubio
Songs written by Marco Flores (songwriter)